Ministry for the Information and Communications Technologies (abbreviated MinTIC), is the national executive ministry of the Government of Colombia responsible for overseeing the information and communication technologies, telecommunications and broadcasting industries in Colombia.

History
Former Ministry of Telecommunications, adopted its new name by decree 1341 of 2009. 

The current Minister is Sylvia Constaín, appointed by Colombia's president Ivan Duque.

References

 
Communications in Colombia
Ministries established in 2009
Communications ministries